Ned Blackhawk (b. ca. 1970) is a Te-Moak tribe, Western Shoshone American historian currently on the faculty of Yale University. In 2007 he received the Frederick Jackson Turner Award for his first major book, Violence Over the Land: Indians and Empire in the Early American West (2006) which also received the Robert M. Utley Prize in 2007.

Life
Blackhawk grew up as an "urban Indian" in Detroit, Michigan. He is of the Te-Moak Tribe of Western Shoshone Indians of Nevada.  He graduated from McGill University in 1992.  He earned his Ph.D. in history in 1999 from the University of Washington.

He first taught American Indian Studies at the University of Wisconsin–Madison where he was on the faculty from 1999 to 2009.

In the fall of 2009, Blackhawk joined the faculty of Yale University, where he is affiliated with the History and American Studies departments. He is one of  three Yale professors who are American Indian. The other Yale professors are Hi'ilei Hobart and Gerald Torres. Blackhawk is also affiliated with the Yale Group for the Study of Native America.

Blackhawk served till 2011 on the Managing Board of the American Quarterly, the journal of the American Studies Association. In 2012 Blackhawk joined the Advisory Board of the International Museum for Family History.

Awards
 2007 Frederick Jackson Turner Award and  the Robert M. Utley Prize for his Violence Over the Land: Indians and Empire in the Early American West
 1996–1997 Katrin H. Lamon Resident Scholar

Works
 
 - for young adults
 Violence Over the Land: Colonial Encounters in the American Great Basin, University of Washington, 1999

References

External links
"Ned Blackhawk Interview", The Progressive, 2007, podcast 
J. Kehaulani Kauanui, "Interview with Ned Blackhawk", Indigenous Politics: From Native New England and Beyond, original podcast 19 March 2007, posted Apr 05, 2009
Spady, James O'Neil (2009) "Reconsidering Empire: Current Interpretations of Native American Agency during Colonization" (review), Journal of Colonialism and Colonial History, Vol. 10, No. 2

Native American academics
21st-century American historians
21st-century American male writers
University of Washington College of Arts and Sciences alumni
University of Wisconsin–Madison faculty
1970s births
Living people
Western Shoshone people
Native American writers
American male non-fiction writers
20th-century Native Americans
21st-century Native Americans